Samādhi (Pali and ), in Buddhism, Hinduism, Jainism, Sikhism and yogic schools, is a state of meditative consciousness. In Buddhism, it is the last of the eight elements of the Noble Eightfold Path. In the Ashtanga Yoga tradition, it is the eighth and final limb identified in the Yoga Sutras of Patanjali.

In the oldest Buddhist sutras, on which several contemporary western Theravada teachers rely, it refers to the development of an investigative and luminous mind which is equanimous and mindful. In the yogic traditions, and the Buddhist commentarial tradition on which the Burmese Vipassana movement and the Thai Forest tradition rely, it is interpreted as a meditative absorption or trance, attained by the practice of dhyāna.

Definitions 
Samadhi may refer to a broad range of states. A common understanding regards samadhi as meditative absorption:
 Sarbacker: samādhi is meditative absorption or contemplation.
 Diener, Erhard & Fischer-Schreiber: samādhi is a non-dualistic state of consciousness in which the consciousness of the experiencing subject becomes one with the observing object.

In a Buddhist context, a more nuanced understanding sees samadhi as a state of intensified awareness and investigation of bodily and mental objects or experiences:
 Dogen: "The Buddha says: "When you monks unify your minds, the mind is in samadhi. Since the mind is in samadhi, you know the characteristics of the creation and destruction of the various phenomena in the world [...] When you gain samadhi, the mind is not scattered, just as those who protect themselves from floods guard the levee.""
 Richard Shankman: "The term samadhi basically means "undistractedness."" It may be viewed as "an exclusive focus on a single object," but also as "a broader state of awareness in which the mind remains steady and unmoving, yet aware of a wide range of phenomena around the meditation object." According to Shankman, the related term cittas'ekaggata may be rendered as "one-pointedness," fixated on a single object, but also as "unification of mind," in which mind becomes very still but does not merge with the object of attention, and is thus able to observe and gain insight into the changing flow of experience.
 Dan Lusthaus: "Samadhi provides the methodology and context within which experience is to be examined [...] Samadhi, by training, focusing/collecting, cleansing and calming the mind [...] facilitates things being finally known (janatti) and seen (passati) just as they are (tathata).
 Keren Arbel: "Samadhi is depicted [in the Buddhist sutras] as a broad field of awareness, knowing but non-discursive [...] a stable, discerning and focused mind."
 Tilmann Vetter: argues that the second, third and fourth dhyana in Buddhism, samma-samadhi, "right samadhi," build on a "spontaneous awareness" (sati) and equanimity which is perfected in the fourth dhyana.

In Hinduism, samadhi is also interpreted as the identification with the Absolute:
 Paramahansa Yogananda: A soundless state of breathlessness. A blissful super consciousness state in which a yogi perceives the identity of the individualized Soul and Cosmic Spirit.

Etymology

Sanskrit 
Various interpretations for the term's etymology are possible, either with the root sam ("to bring together") or sama ("the same, equalized, the convergence of two distinct things"). According to Dan Lusthaus, samadhi refers to either bringing to consciousness the samskaras ("buried latencies"), or meditative concentration on a meditation object:
 sam, "to bring together"; adhi, "to place on, put, to impregnate, to give, to receive": the bringing together of cognitive conditions," "bringing the buried latencies or samskaras into full view," so "the obscure and hidden become clear objects of cognition," "the womb through which insight is born."
 sama, "the same, equalized, the convergence of two distinct things based on some commonality"; adhi, "higher, better, most skilfully achieved": "the skillful unification of mind and object," "the mental equanimity conducive to and derived from attention perfectly focused on its object." "[S]ometimes treated as synonymous with ekacitta, 'one-focused mind,' i.e. mind (citta) completely focused on and at one (eka) with its object."

Etymologies for sam-ā-dhā include:
 sam-ā-dhā’: "'to collect' or 'to bring together', thus suggesting the concentration or unification of the mind"; generally translated [in Buddhism] as "concentration."
 sam-ā-dhā: "to hold together, to concentrate upon." 
 sam, "completely"; ā, "the return towards the subject"; dha, "maintaining together: "to assemble completely"; "the tension borne between two poles of existence (object and thought) is reduced to zero."
 sam, "together" or "integrated"; ā, "towards"; dhā, "to get, to hold": to acquire integration or wholeness, or truth (samāpatti);
 sam, "together"; ā, "toward"; stem of dadhati, "puts, places": a putting or joining;

Particular Hindu/yoga interpretations include:
 sam, "perfect" or "complete"; dhi, "consciousness": "all distinctions between the person who is the subjective meditator, the act of meditation and the object of meditation merge into oneness" (Stephen Sturgess);
 sam, "with"; ādhi, "Lord": Union with the Lord (Stephen Sturgess);
 sama, "equanimous"; dhi, "buddhi or the intellect": equanimous intellect, non-discriminating intellect (Sadhguru);
 sama, "balance"; ādi, "original": " a state that is equal to the original state, which is the state that prevailed before we came into existence"; "original balance" (Kamlesh D. Patel.

Chinese 
Common Chinese terms for samādhi include the transliterations sanmei (三昧) and sanmodi (三摩地 or 三摩提), as well as the translation of the term literally as ding (定 "fixity"). Kumarajiva's translations typically use sanmei (三昧), while the translations of Xuanzang tend to use ding (定 "fixity"). The Chinese Buddhist canon includes these, as well as other translations and transliterations of the term.

Buddhism

Samma-samādhi and dhyāna 

Samma-samadhi, "right samadhi," is the last of the eight elements of the Noble Eightfold Path. When samadhi is developed, things are understood as they really are.

Samma-samadhi is explicated as dhyana, which is traditionally interpreted as one-pointed concentration. Yet, in the stock formula of dhyāna samādhi is only mentioned in the second dhyana, to give way to a state of equanimity and mindfulness, in which one keeps access to the senses in a mindful way, avoiding primary responses to the sense-impressions.

The origins of the practice of dhyāna are a matter of dispute. According to Crangle, the development of meditative practices in ancient India was a complex interplay between Vedic and non-Vedic traditions. According to Bronkhorst, the four rūpa jhāna may be an original contribution of the Buddha to the religious landscape of India, which formed an alternative to the painful ascetic practices of the Jains, while the arūpa jhāna were incorporated from non-Buddhist ascetic traditions. Alexander Wynne argues that dhyāna was incorporated from Brahmanical practices, in the Nikayas ascribed to Alara Kalama and Uddaka Ramaputta. These practices were paired to mindfulness and insight, and given a new interpretation. Kalupahana also argues that the Buddha "reverted to the meditational practices" he had learned from Alara Kalama and Uddaka Ramaputta.

The rupa jhānas

The arupas

Appended to the jhana-scheme are four meditative states, referred to in the early texts as arupas or as āyatana. They are sometimes mentioned in sequence after the first four jhānas and thus came to be treated by later exegetes as jhānas. The immaterial are related to, or derived from, yogic meditation, and aim more specific at concentration, while the jhanas proper are related to the cultivation of the mind. The state of complete dwelling in emptiness is reached when the eighth jhāna is transcended. The four arupas are:
 fifth jhāna: infinite space (Pali ākāsānañcāyatana, Skt. ākāśānantyāyatana),
 sixth jhāna: infinite consciousness (Pali viññāṇañcāyatana, Skt. vijñānānantyāyatana),
 seventh jhāna: infinite nothingness (Pali ākiñcaññāyatana, Skt. ākiṃcanyāyatana),
 eighth jhāna: neither perception nor non-perception (Pali nevasaññānāsaññāyatana, Skt. naivasaṃjñānāsaṃjñāyatana).

Although the "Dimension of Nothingness" and the "Dimension of Neither Perception nor Non-Perception" are included in the list of nine jhanas attributed to the Buddha, they are not included in the Noble Eightfold Path. Noble Path number eight is "Samma Samadhi" (Right Concentration), and only the first four Jhanas are considered "Right Concentration". When all the jhanas are mentioned, the emphasis is on the "Cessation of Feelings and Perceptions" rather than stopping short at the "Dimension of Neither Perception nor Non-Perception".

Theravāda

Samadhi as concentration
According to Gunaratana, the term ‘samādhi’ derives from the roots ‘sam-ā-dhā’, which means 'to collect' or 'bring together', and thus it is generally translated as "concentration." In the early Buddhist texts, samādhi is also associated with the term samatha (calm abiding). In the commentarial tradition, samādhi is defined as ekaggata, one-pointedness of mind (Cittass'ekaggatā).

Buddhagosa defines samādhi as "the centering of consciousness and consciousness concomitants evenly and rightly on a single object [...] the state in virtue of which consciousness and its concomitants remain evenly and rightly on a single object, undistracted and unscattered". According to Buddhaghosa, the Theravada Pali texts mention four attainments of samādhi:
 Momentary concentration (khanikasamādhi): a mental stabilization which arises during samatha meditation.
 Preliminary concentration (parikammasamādhi): arises out of the meditator's initial attempts to focus on a meditation object.
 Access concentration (upacārasamādhi): arises when the five hindrances are dispelled, when jhāna is present, and with the appearance the 'counterpart sign' (patibhaganimitta).
 Absorption concentration (appanasamādhi): the total immersion of the mind on its meditation of object and stabilization of all four jhānas.

According to Buddhaghosa, in his influential standard-work Visuddhimagga, samādhi is the "proximate cause" to the obtainment of wisdom. The Visuddhimagga describes 40 different objects for meditation, which are mentioned throughout the Pali canon, but explicitly enumerated in the Visuddhimagga, such as mindfulness of breathing (ānāpānasati) and loving kindness (mettā).

Criticism
While the Theravada-tradition interprets dhyana as one-pointed concentration, this interpretation has become a matter of debate. According to Richard Gombrich, the sequence of the four rupa-jhanas describes two different cognitive states: "I know this is controversial, but it seems to me that the third and fourth jhanas are thus quite unlike the second."

Alexander Wynne states that the dhyana-scheme is poorly understood. According to Wynne, words expressing the inculcation of awareness, such as sati, sampajāno, and upekkhā, are mistranslated or understood as particular factors of meditative states, whereas they refer to a particular way of perceiving the sense objects.

Several western teachers (Thanissaro Bhikkhu, Leigh Brazington, Richard Shankman) make a distinction between 'sutta-oriented' jhana  and Visuddhimagga-oriented' jhāna. Thanissaro Bhikkhu has repeatedly argued that the Pali Canon and the Visuddhimagga give different descriptions of the jhanas, regarding the Visuddhimagga-description to be incorrect. Keren Arbel has conducted extensive research on the jhānas and the contemporary criticisms of the commentarial interpretation. Based on this research, and her own experience as a senior meditation-teacher, she gives a reconstructed account of the original meaning of the dhyanas. She argues that the four jhānas are the outcome of both
calming the mind and developing insight into the nature of experience and cannot not be seen in the suttas as two distinct and separated meditation techniques, but as integral dimensions of a single process that
leads to awakening. She concludes that "the fourth jhāna is the optimal experiential event for the utter de-conditioning of unwholesome tendencies of mind and for the transformation of deep epistemological structures. This is because one embodies and actualizes an awakened awareness of experience."

Mahāyāna

Indian Mahāyāna 
The earliest extant Indian Mahāyāna texts emphasize ascetic practices, forest-dwelling, and states of meditative oneness, i.e. samādhi. These practices seem to have occupied a central place in early Mahāyāna, also because they "may have given access to fresh revelations and inspiration".

Indian Mahāyāna traditions refer to numerous forms of samādhi, for example, Section 21 of the Mahavyutpatti records 118 distinct forms of samādhi and the Samadhiraja Sutra has as its main theme a samādhi called 'the samādhi that is manifested as the sameness of the essential nature of all dharmas' (sarva-dharma-svabhavā-samatā-vipañcita-samādhi).

Vimokṣamukha 

Buddhist Pali texts describe three kinds of samādhi which the commentarial tradition identify as the ‘gates of liberation’ (vimokṣamukha):
 Signlessness-samadhi (Sa: ānimitta-samādhi) (Pi: animitto samādhi) or marklessness-concentration (Sa: alakṣaṇa-samādhi)
 Aimlessness-samadhi (Sa: apraṇihita-samādhi) (Pi: appaṇihito samādhi)
 Emptiness-samadhi (Sa: śūnyatā-samādhi) (Pi: suññato samādhi)

According to Polak, these are alternative descriptions of the four dhyanas, describing the cognitive aspects instead of the bodily aspects. According to Polak, in the final stages of dhyana no ideation of experience takes place, and no signs are grasped (animitta samādhi), which means that the concentrated attention cannot be directed (appaṇihita samādhi) towards those signs, and only the perception of the six senses remains, without a notion of "self" (suññata samādhi).

In the Chinese Buddhist tradition these are called the ‘three doors of liberation’: These three are not always cited in the same order. Nagarjuna, a Madhyamaka Buddhist scholar, in his Maha-prajnaparamita-sastra, listed apraṇihita before ānimitta in his first explanation on these "three samādhi", but in later listings and explanations in the same work reverted to the more common order. Others, such as Thích Nhất Hạnh, a Thien Buddhist teacher, list apraṇihita as the third after śūnyatā and ānimitta. Nagarjuna lists these three kinds of samādhi among the qualities of the truly enlightened (bodhisattva).

Signlessness samadhi
According to Nagarjuna, signlessness-samadhi is the samādhi in which one recognises all dharmas are free of signs (ānimitta). According to Thích Nhất Hạnh, "signs" refer to appearances or form, likening signlessness samadhi to not being fooled by appearances, such as the dichotomy of being and non-being.

Aimlessness-samadhi
According to Dan Lusthaus, aimlessness-samadhi is characterised by a lack of aims or plans for the future and no desire for the objects of perception. According to Nagarjuna, aimlessness-samadhi is the samādhi in which one does not search for any kind of existence (bhāva), letting go of aims or wishes (praṇidhāna) regarding conditioned phenomena and not producing the three poisons (namely, passion, aggression, and ignorance) towards them in the future.

Emptiness-samadhi 
According to Nagarjuna, emptiness-samadhi is the samādhi in which one recognises that the true natures of all dharmas are absolutely empty (atyantaśūnya), and that the five aggregates are not the self (anātman), do not belong to the self (anātmya), and are empty (śūnya) without self-nature.

Zen 

Indian dhyāna was translated as chán in Chinese, and zen in Japanese. Ideologically the Zen-tradition emphasizes prajñā and sudden insight, but in the actual practice prajñā and samādhi, or sudden insight and gradual cultivation, are paired to each other. Especially some lineages in the Rinzai school of Zen stress sudden insight, while the Sōtō school of Zen lays more emphasis on shikantaza, training awareness of the stream of thoughts, allowing them to arise and pass away without interference. Historically, many traditional Japanese arts were developed or refined to attain samādhi, including incense appreciation (香道, kodõ), flower arranging (華道, kadō), the tea ceremony (茶道, sadō), calligraphy (書道, shodō), and martial arts such as archery (弓道, kyūdō). The Japanese character 道 means the way or the path and indicates that disciplined practice in the art is a path to samādhi.

Hinduism

Patanjali's Yoga Sūtras 

Samādhi is the eighth limb of the Yoga Sūtras, following the sixth and seventh limbs of dhāraṇā and dhyāna respectively.

Samyama 

According to Taimni, dhāraṇā, dhyāna, and samādhi form a graded series:
 Dhāraṇā ― In dhāraṇā, the mind learns to focus on a single object of thought. The object of focus is called a pratyaya. In dhāraṇā, the yogi learns to prevent other thoughts from intruding on focusing awareness on the pratyaya.
 Dhyāna ― Over time and with practice, the yogin learns to sustain awareness of only the pratyaya, thereby dhāraṇā transforms into dhyāna. In dhyāna, the yogin comes to realize the triplicity of perceiver (the yogin), perceived (the pratyaya) and the act of perceiving. The new element added to the practice of dhyāna, that distinguish it from dhāraṇā is the yogi learns to minimize the perceiver element of this triplicity. In this fashion, dhyāna is the gradual minimization of the perceiver, or the fusion of the observer with the observed (the pratyaya).
 Samādhi ― When the yogin can: (1) sustain focus on the pratyaya for an extended period of time, and (2) minimize their self-consciousness during the practice, then dhyāna transforms into samādhi. In this fashion, then, the yogin becomes fused with the pratyaya. Patanjali compares this to placing a transparent jewel on a coloured surface: the jewel takes on the colour of the surface. Similarly, in samādhi, the consciousness of the yogin fuses with the object of thought, the pratyaya. The pratyaya is like the coloured surface, and the yogin's consciousness is like the transparent jewel.

Samādhi in the Yoga Sūtras 
Samādhi is oneness with the object of meditation. There is no distinction between act of meditation and the object of meditation. Samādhi is of two kinds, with and without support of an object of meditation:

 Samprajñata samādhi (also called savikalpa samādhi and sabija samādhi,) refers to samādhi with the support of an object of meditation. In Sutra 1:17 Patanjali tells us that samprajnata samādhi comprises four stages: "complete high consciousness (samprajnata samādhi) is that which is accompanied by vitarka (deliberation), vicara (reflection), ānanda (ecstasy), and asmitā (a sense of 'I'-ness)".

The first two, deliberation and reflection, form the basis of the various types of samāpatti:
 Savitarka, "deliberative": The mind, citta, is concentrated upon a gross object of meditation, an object with a manifest appearance that is perceptible to our senses, such as a flame of a lamp, the tip of the nose, or the image of a deity. Conceptualization (vikalpa) still takes place, in the form of perception, the word and the knowledge of the object of meditation. When the deliberation is ended this is called nirvitarka samāpatti.
 Savichara, "reflective": the mind, citta, is concentrated upon a subtle object of meditation, which is not perceptible to the senses, but arrived at through inference, such as the senses, the process of cognition, the mind, the I-am-ness, the chakras, the inner-breath (prana), the nadis, the intellect (buddhi). The stilling of reflection is called nirvichara samāpatti.

The last two associations, sānanda samādhi and sāsmitā, are respectively a state of meditation, and an object of savichara samādhi:
 Ānanda, "with bliss": also known as "supreme bliss", or "with ecstasy", this state emphasizes the still subtler state of bliss in meditation; ānanda is free from vitarka and vicara. 
 Āsmitā, "with egoity": the citta is concentrated upon the sense or feeling of "I-am-ness".

Asamprajñata samādhi (also called nirvikalpa samādhi and nirbija samādhi) refers to samādhi without the support of an object of meditation, which leads to knowledge of purusha or consciousness, the subtlest element.

Samprajñata samādhi 
According to Paramahansa Yogananda, in this state one lets go of the ego and becomes aware of Spirit beyond creation. The soul is then able to absorb the fire of Spirit-Wisdom that "roasts" or destroys the seeds of body-bound inclinations. The soul as the meditator, its state of meditation, and the Spirit as the object of meditation all become one. The separate wave of the soul meditating in the ocean of Spirit becomes merged with the Spirit. The soul does not lose its identity, but only expands into Spirit. In savikalpa samādhi the mind is conscious only of the Spirit within; it is not conscious of the exterior world. The body is in a trancelike state, but the consciousness is fully perceptive of its blissful experience within.

Apollo 14 astronaut Edgar Mitchell, founder of the Institute of Noetic Sciences, has compared the experience of seeing the earth from space, also known as the overview effect, to savikalpa samādhi.

Ānanda and asmitā 
According to Ian Whicher, the status of ānanda and āsmitā in Patanjali's system is a matter of dispute. According to Maehle, the first two constituents, deliberation and reflection, form the basis of the various types of samāpatti. According to Feuerstein:

Ian Whicher disagrees with Feuerstein, seeing ānanda and asmitā as later stages of nirvicara-samāpatti. Whicher refers to Vācaspati Miśra (900–980 CE), the founder of the Bhāmatī Advaita Vedanta who proposes eight types of samāpatti:
 Savitarka-samāpatti and nirvitarka-samāpatti, both with gross objects as objects of support;
 Savicāra-samāpatti and nirvicāra-samāpatti, both with subtle objects as objects of support;
 Sānanda-samāpatti and nirānanda-samāpatti, both with the sense organs as objects of support
 Sāsmitā-samāpatti and nirasmitā-samāpatti, both with the sense of "I-am-ness" as support.

Vijnana Bikshu (ca. 1550–1600) proposes a six-stage model, explicitly rejecting Vacaspati Misra's model. Vijnana Bikshu regards joy (ānanda) as a state that arises when the mind passes beyond the vicara stage. Whicher agrees that ānanda is not a separate stage of samādhi. According to Whicher, Patanjali's own view seems to be that nirvicara-samādhi is the highest form of cognitive ecstasy.

According to Sarasvati Buhrman, "Babaji once explained that when people feel blissful sensations during sādhanā, on a gross level the breath is equal in both nostrils, and on the subtle level pranic flow in ida and pingala nadis is balanced. This is called the sushumna breath because the residual prana of the sushuma, the kundalini, flows in sushumna nadi, causing sattva guna to dominate. "It creates a feeling of peace. That peace is ānanda". In sānanda samādhi the experience of that ānanda, that sattvic flow, is untainted by any other vrittis, or thoughts, save the awareness of the pleasure of receiving that bliss".

Asamprajñata samādhi 
According to Maehle, asamprajñata samādhi (also called nirvikalpa samādhi and nirbija samādhi) leads to knowledge of purusha or consciousness, the subtlest element. Heinrich Zimmer distinguishes nirvikalpa samādhi from other states as follows:

Swami Sivananda describes nirbija samādhi (lit. "samādhi" without seeds) as follows:

Sahaja samadhi 
Ramana Maharshi distinguished between kevala nirvikalpa samadhi and sahaja nirvikalpa samādhi:

Kevala nirvikalpa samādhi is temporary, <ref group=web name="Godman">[http://davidgodman.org/rteach/iandii2.shtml David Godman, I' and 'I-I' – A Reader's Query]</ref> whereas sahaja nirvikalpa samādhi is a continuous state throughout daily activity. This state seems inherently more complex than sāmadhi, since it involves several aspects of life, namely external activity, internal quietude, and the relation between them. It also seems to be a more advanced state, since it comes after the mastering of samādhi.Sahaja is one of the four keywords of the Nath sampradaya along with Svecchachara, Sama, and Samarasa. Sahaja meditation and worship was prevalent in Tantric traditions common to Hinduism and Buddhism in Bengal as early as the 8th–9th centuries.

 Nirvikalpaka yoga Nirvikalpaka yoga is a term in the philosophical system of Shaivism, in which, through samādhi, there is a complete identification of the "I" and Shiva, in which the very concepts of name and form disappear and Shiva alone is experienced as the real Self. In that system, this experience occurs when there is complete cessation of all thought-constructs.

 Buddhist influences 

Patanjali's description of samādhi resembles the Buddhist jhānas. According to Jianxin Li, samprajñata samādhi may be compared to the rūpa jhānas of Buddhism. This interpretation may conflict with Gombrich and Wynne, according to whom the first and second jhāna represent concentration, whereas the third and fourth jhāna combine concentration with mindfulness. According to Eddie Crangle, the first jhāna resembles Patanjali's samprajñata samādhi, which both share the application of vitarka and vicara.

According to David Gordon White, the language of the Yoga Sūtras is often closer to "Buddhist Hybrid Sanskrit, the Sanskrit of the early Mahāyana Buddhist scriptures, than to the classical Sanskrit of other Hindu scriptures". According to Karel Werner:

Robert Thurman writes that Patañjali was influenced by the success of the Buddhist monastic system to formulate his own matrix for the version of thought he considered orthodox. However, the Yoga Sutra, especially the fourth segment of Kaivalya Pada, contains several polemical verses critical of Buddhism, particularly the Vijñānavāda school of Vasubandhu.

While Patañjali was influenced by Buddhism, and incorporated Buddhist thought and terminology, the term "nirvikalpa samādhi" is unusual in a Buddhist context, though some authors have equated nirvikalpa samādhi with the formless jhānas and/or nirodha samāpatti.Donald Jay Rothberg, Sean M. Kelly (1998), Ken Wilber in Dialogue: Conversations with Leading Transpersonal Thinkers

A similar term, is found in the Buddhist Yogacara tradition, and is translated by Edward Conze as "undifferentiated cognition". Conze notes that, in Yogacara, only the actual experience of  can prove the reports given of it in scriptures. He describes the term as used in the Yogacara context as follows:
 A different sense in Buddhist usage occurs in the Sanskrit expression  that means "makes free from uncertainty (or false discrimination)" i.e. "distinguishes, considers carefully".

 Bhāva samādhi Bhāva samādhi is a state of ecstatic consciousness that can sometimes be a seemingly spontaneous experience, but is recognized generally to be the culmination of long periods of devotional practices. It is believed by some groups to be evoked through the presence of "higher beings". Bhāva samādhi has been experienced by notable figures in Indian spiritual history, including Sri Ramakrishna Paramahamsa and some of his disciples, Chaitanya Mahaprabhu and his chief disciple Nityananda, Mirabai and numerous saints in the bhakti tradition.

 Mahāsamādhi 
In Hindu or Yogic traditions, mahāsamādhi, the "great" and final samādhi, is the act of consciously and intentionally leaving one's body at the moment of death. According to this belief, a realized and liberated (Jivanmukta) yogi or yogini who has attained the state of nirvikalpa samādhi can consciously exit from their body and attain enlightenment at the moment of death while in a deep, conscious meditative state.

Some individuals have, according to their followers, declared the day and time of their mahāsamādhi beforehand. These include Lahiri Mahasaya whose death on September 26, 1895, was of this nature, according to Paramahansa Yogananda. Paramahansa Yogananda's own death on March 7, 1952, was described by his followers as entering mahāsamādhi. Daya Mata, one of Yogananda's direct disciples, said that Yogananda on the previous evening had asked her "Do you realize that it is just a matter of hours and I will be gone from this earth?"

 Sikhism 

In Sikhism the word is used to refer to an action that one uses to remember and fix one's mind and soul on Waheguru. The Sri Guru Granth Sahib informs:
 "Remember in meditation the Almighty Lord, every moment and every instant; meditate on God in the celestial peace of Samādhi." (p. 508)
 "I am attached to God in celestial Samādhi." (p. 865)
 "The most worthy Samādhi is to keep the consciousness stable and focused on Him." (p. 932)

The term Samadhi'' refers to a state of mind rather than a physical position of the body. The Scriptures explain:
 "I am absorbed in celestial Samādhi, lovingly attached to the Lord forever. I live by singing the Glorious Praises of the Lord" (p. 1232)
 "Night and day, they ravish and enjoy the Lord within their hearts; they are intuitively absorbed in Samadhi. ||2||" (p. 1259)

The Sikh Gurus inform their followers:
 "Some remain absorbed in Samādhi, their minds fixed lovingly on the One Lord; they reflect only on the Word of the Shabad." (p. 503)

 Sufism 
The idea of Fanaa in Sufi Islam has been compared to Samadhi.

 See also Buddhism Bhāvanā
 Samatha
 Sati (Buddhism)
 Satori
 VipassanāGeneral Ego death
 Nondualism
 Religious ecstasy
 Samadhi (shrine)Hinduism Dhyana in Hinduism
 Rāja yoga
 Bhakti Yoga
 TuriyaIslam Baqaa
 FanaaJainism Yogadṛṣṭisamuccaya
 Jain meditationWestern traditions'''
 Stoicism

Notes

References

Sources 
Printed sources

 
 

 
 
 
 

 
 
 
 

 

 
 
 

 

 
 

 
 

 

 
 

 

 

 
 
 
 
 
 
 
 
 

 

 

 
 
 

 

Web-sources

External links 

 Theravada Buddhism
 Samma Samadhi, by Ajahn Chah
 Samadhi is Pure Enjoyment, by Ajahn Sucitto
 Samādhi in Buddhism, by P. A. Payutto
 Samadhi for Liberation, by Ajahn Anan Akincano
 Wisdom Develops Samadhi, by Ajahn Maha Boowa
 Lessons in Samadhi, by Ajahn Lee Dhammadharo

 Tibetan Buddhism
 Developing Samadhi, by Lama Gelek Rinpoche
 Hinduism
 The question of the importance of Samadhi in modern and classical Advaita Vedanta, Michael Comans (1993)
 Raja Yoga Samadhi, Sri Swami Sivananda (2005)

Mental factors in Buddhism
Buddhist meditation
Buddhist philosophical concepts
Hindu philosophical concepts
Eight limbs of yoga
Death and Hinduism
Hindu tantra
Tantric practices
Ramakrishna
Bhakti movement
Jain philosophy
Eastern esotericism